Dreams of Tomorrow is an album by keyboardist Lonnie Liston Smith, featuring performances recorded and released by the Flying Dutchman label in 1983.

Reception

In his review for AllMusic, Richard S. Ginell stated "little had changed in his music, which remains pleasant, gently funky and deeply into spiritual concerns but not in a heavy way".

Track listing
All compositions by Lonnie Liston Smith except where noted
 "A Lonely Way to Be" (Marcus Miller) − 4:33
 "Mystic Woman" − 4:38
 "The Love I See in Your Eyes" (Miller) − 3:39
 "Dreams of Tomorrow" − 4:17
 "Never Too Late" (Miller) − 5:19
 "Rainbows of Love" − 4:12
 "Divine Light" (Lonnie Liston Smith, Sri Chinmoy) − 3:33
 "A Garden of Peace" − 3:09

Personnel
Lonnie Liston Smith − electric piano, acoustic piano
Marcus Miller − bass, Prophet 5 synthesizer, guitar (tracks 1-5 & 7)
Donald Smith − flute, lead vocals (tracks 1-7)
David Hubbard − soprano saxophone (tracks 1, 3 & 5-7)
Yogi Horton (tracks 1, 2 & 5), Buddy Williams (tracks 3, 4, 6 & 7) − drums 
Steve Thornton − percussion (tracks 1-7)

References

1983 albums
Doctor Jazz Records albums
Lonnie Liston Smith albums
Albums produced by Marcus Miller